Sir John Stepney, 8th Baronet (19 September 1743 – 3 October 1811), of Llanelli, Carmarthenshire, was a Welsh politician who sat in the House of Commons  from 1767 to 1788.

He was born the first son of Sir Thomas Stepney, 7th Bt., of Llanelly and educated at Christ Church, Oxford, where he matriculated in 1760.  He succeeded his father as 8th Baronet in 1772.

He was a Member (MP) of the Parliament of Great Britain for Monmouth Boroughs from 1767 to 1788.

He died unmarried in Trnava, Hungary in 1811. He was succeeded to the baronetcy by his brother Thomas, but left his estate to his illegitimate child, William Chambers.

References

1743 births
1811 deaths
People from Llanelli
People from Carmarthenshire
Alumni of Christ Church, Oxford
Baronets in the Baronetage of England
Members of the Parliament of Great Britain for Welsh constituencies
British MPs 1761–1768
British MPs 1768–1774
British MPs 1774–1780
British MPs 1780–1784